Anton "Ante" Josipović (born 22 October 1961) is a former Yugoslav boxer from Bosnia and Herzegovina (then part of Yugoslavia). He won the light heavyweight gold medal at the 1984 Summer Olympics. Though Croatian, he was born in Banja Luka, Bosnia and Herzegovina, Yugoslavia.

Amateur career

Olympic results
1984 - Olympic Games, Los Angeles, California: Gold Medal (light heavyweight)
W-PTS 4-1 Markus Bott (Germany),
W-PTS 5-0 Georgica Donici (Romania),
W-PTS 5-0 Mustapha Moussa (Algeria),
W-Forfeit Kevin Barry (New Zealand)

Pro career
Josipović began his professional career in 1990 and won his first eight bouts. In 1994, he took on Asmir Vojnović for the Croatian Cruiserweight Title and lost a decision. In the rematch in 1995, Josipović again lost by decision and retired from boxing.

Professional boxing record

|-
|align="center" colspan=8|8 Wins (4 knockouts, 4 decisions), 2 Losses (0 knockouts, 2 decisions)
|-
| align="center" style="border-style: none none solid solid; background: #e3e3e3"|Result
| align="center" style="border-style: none none solid solid; background: #e3e3e3"|Record
| align="center" style="border-style: none none solid solid; background: #e3e3e3"|Opponent
| align="center" style="border-style: none none solid solid; background: #e3e3e3"|Type
| align="center" style="border-style: none none solid solid; background: #e3e3e3"|Round
| align="center" style="border-style: none none solid solid; background: #e3e3e3"|Date
| align="center" style="border-style: none none solid solid; background: #e3e3e3"|Location
| align="center" style="border-style: none none solid solid; background: #e3e3e3"|Notes
|-align=center
|Loss
|
|align=left| Asmir Vojnovic
|PTS
|10
|17/06/1995
|align=left| Zagreb, Croatia
|align=left|
|-
|Loss
|
|align=left| Asmir Vojnovic
|UD
|10
|10/12/1994
|align=left| Rijeka, Croatia
|align=left|
|-
|Win
|
|align=left| Albert Toma
|TKO
|3
|09/04/1992
|align=left| Celano, Abruzzo, Italy
|align=left|
|-
|Win
|
|align=left| Matthew Saad Muhammad
|PTS
|8
|09/05/1991
|align=left| Novi Sad, Yugoslavia
|align=left|
|-
|Win
|
|align=left| Dave Owens
|UD
|8
|17/02/1991
|align=left| Prijedor, Yugoslavia
|align=left|
|-
|Win
|
|align=left| Kemper Morton
|PTS
|8
|17/01/1991
|align=left| Sarajevo, Yugoslavia
|align=left|
|-
|Win
|
|align=left| Kabunda Kamanga
|TKO
|4
|22/11/1990
|align=left| Zenica, Yugoslavia
|align=left|
|-
|Win
|
|align=left| Yves Monsieur
|KO
|6
|04/10/1990
|align=left| Banja Luka, Yugoslavia
|align=left|
|-
|Win
|
|align=left| John Held
|PTS
|8
|25/08/1990
|align=left| Bihać, Yugoslavia
|align=left|
|-
|Win
|
|align=left| Renald De Vulder
|TKO
|4
|12/07/1990
|align=left| Doboj, Yugoslavia
|align=left|
|}

Personal life
He later became a sports journalist and covered Holyfield's career. In 1997, he was shot and seriously wounded by an unidentified assailant in the Bosnian (Republika Srpska) town of Banja Luka.

References

External links
 
 Profile on Serbian Olympic Committee

1961 births
Living people
Bosnia and Herzegovina male boxers
Light-heavyweight boxers
Olympic boxers of Yugoslavia
Boxers at the 1984 Summer Olympics
Olympic gold medalists for Yugoslavia
Sportspeople from Banja Luka
Croats of Bosnia and Herzegovina
Olympic medalists in boxing
Yugoslav male boxers
Medalists at the 1984 Summer Olympics